Stropharia albonitens is an inedible mushroom found in grassy fields, lawns, and frequently along roadsides in North America and Europe. The spore print is purplish to black. It is white to cream or yellow in colour. It is typically 5 to 15 cm long with a ring on its stem and grows from July to November.

This species was published in Champs Jura Vosges 3: 439 (1875) and was originally named Agaricus albonitens in 1857 by Elias Magnus Fries.

References

Strophariaceae
Inedible fungi
Fungi described in 1857
Taxa named by Elias Magnus Fries